La Grandière was an  of the French Navy, designed to operate from French colonies in Asia and Africa. She was ordered under the 1937 programme and launched on 22 June 1939 as Ville d'Ys, but completed as La Grandière.

She served in the South Pacific Area during the Second World War, and then fought in the Korean War, taking part in the Inchon Landing. She then returned to surveillance missions in the French territories in the Pacific. She was scrapped in 1959.

References

Sources

 

 

1939 ships
Bougainville-class avisos
Ships built in France
Military history of France during the Korean War